Unorganized South East Cochrane District is an unorganized area in the Canadian province of Ontario, encompassing the small portion of the Cochrane District, immediately surrounding Highway 11 at the division's southern boundary with the Timiskaming District, which is not part of the municipality of Black River-Matheson which surrounds it. It consists of the southern half of the geographic township of Benoit and is the southernmost limit of the Great Clay Belt of northern Ontario.

The division had a population of 15 in the Canada 2011 Census, and a land area of 53.19 square kilometres. The main settlement in the division is the ghost town of Bourkes, located at the Ontario Northland Railway crossing on Bourkes road. The area was initially settled by Scandinavian immigrants around 1911 as a dairy farming region and by 1914 had a store, railway station and siding, school, post office and bunkhouse as well as two gold mines. The population peaked in the 1930s at 300, but slowly declined after the two local gold mines were shuttered and the timber trade dried up. The post office was closed in 1969 and the last store closed in the 1970s, today, only the disused bunkhouse and a few scattered houses remain of the settlement.

Demographics

Population:
 Population in 2006: 25
 Population in 2001: 21
 Population in 1996: 29
 Population in 1991: 38

See also
List of townships in Ontario

References

Cochrane South East
Geography of Cochrane District